Dan C. Stevenson is a former Democratic member of the Indiana House of Representatives, representing the 11th District from 1994 until November 2012. Former Representative Stevenson opted to retire in 2012. He also retired from his full-time job at ArcelorMittal USA (formerly Inland Steel Company) in December 2012 after nearly 35 years with the company. He and his family moved to Orlando, Florida in November 2012. In July 2015 they moved to Portage, Indiana.

References

External links
Indiana State Legislature - Representative Dan Stevenson Official government website
Dan Stevenson at Ballotpedia
Project Vote Smart - Representative Dan C. Stevenson (IN) profile
Follow the Money - Dan Stevenson
2006 2002 2000 1998 campaign contributions

Democratic Party members of the Indiana House of Representatives
1959 births
Living people
People from Highland, Lake County, Indiana